Platypus is the English common name of the Australian egg-laying mammal of action which in science language is called the Ornithorhynchus anatinus.

Platypus may also refer to:

Biology
Platypus (beetle), a genus of ambrosia beetle in the subfamily Platypodinae of the weevil family Curculionidae
Platypus, a taxonomic synonym of the orchid genus Eulophia
Zacco platypus, the pale chub, a freshwater fish indigenous to China

Music
Platipus Records, a record label
Platypus (band), a progressive rock / jazz-fusion supergroup
Flobots Present... Platypus, an album
Platypus (I Hate You), a song by Green Day
"Platypus", a song from the album Disco Volante, by the band Mr. Bungle
The Subways, an English indie rock band (earlier name)

Other
Platypus Man, a 1995 American sitcom
Platypus (video game), a horizontal shoot-em-up game and its sequel
Perry the Platypus, a fictional character as featured in Phineas and Ferb
Platypus Trophy, a trophy awarded to the winner of the Oregon–Oregon State college football game
PLATYPUS, a neutron beam reflectometer
Platypus (glider), the Australian-designed Schneider ES-65 glider
Sukhoi Su-34, a Russian 2-seat fighter-bomber (nickname)
Platypus (bullion coin), an Australian platinum bullion coin